This page describes the stances held by Democratic candidates in the 2020 United States presidential election on a variety of policy issues (e.g. domestic and foreign issues). Only candidates still in the race during the 2020 Iowa caucuses are included.

Domestic policy

Education

Environmental issues

Gun control

Health care

Immigration and border security

Technology

Economy

Economics

Labor and welfare issues

Foreign policy and national security

Foreign policy

Defense

Government

Electoral and institutional reform

Campaign finance

Social issues

Abortion

Criminal justice

LGBT+ issues

Candidate Solidarity

Pledge to support eventual nominee
Candidates have been encouraged by organisations, namely Indivisible Project and Individual Action, to take a pledge of unity, known as 'We Are Indivisible'. This means supporting the eventual Democratic nominee, should the candidate's own nomination be unsuccessful. The stance of each candidate is stated as follows:

References

Democratic Party
2020 United States Democratic presidential primaries